The Yogi Bear Show (also known as The Yogi Bear Show) is a syndicated animated series by Hanna-Barbera Productions that aired between 1967 and 1968.

Overview
The show mainly consisted of reruns of classic shorts from The Yogi Bear Show and The Huckleberry Hound Show featuring Yogi Bear, Huckleberry Hound, Hokey Wolf, Pixie and Dixie, Yakky Doodle and Snagglepuss.

Voice cast
 Daws Butler - Yogi Bear, Huckleberry Hound, Hokey Wolf, Dixie, Mr. Jinks, Fibber, Alfy, Snagglepuss
 Don Messick - Boo Boo, Ranger Smith, Pixie, Major Minor
 Jimmy Weldon - Yakky Doodle
 Vance Colvig - Chopper
 Doug Young - Ding-a-Ling Wolf

See also
 List of animated television series created for syndication

External links
 Yogi Bear & Friends at The Big Cartoon DataBase

1967 American television series debuts
1968 American television series endings
1960s American animated television series
American children's animated comedy television series
American animated television spin-offs
English-language television shows
First-run syndicated television programs in the United States
Yogi Bear television series
Huckleberry Hound television series
Television series by Hanna-Barbera

●https://m.imdb.com/title/tt0255768/?ref_=tt_sims_tt_i_1